Newcourt railway station is the newest railway station on the Avocet Line, serving the Newcourt area of Exeter, United Kingdom. The station is managed and operated by Great Western Railway.

History
Following meetings in September and November 2010, a masterplan for the redevelopment of the Newcourt area of Exeter prepared by Atkins was approved by Exeter City Council as a Supplementary Planning Document. The masterplan set out the basis upon which an area of land to the east of Exeter city centre bounded by Topsham Road to the south west, the A379 to the north and Rydon Lane to the west could be sustainably developed to provide  of employment land and 3,500 dwellings. As the masterplan did not assess the transport implications of the proposed development, a supplementary report was published in January 2011 by Devon County Council which identified rail transport as having the greatest potential to reduce levels of private car use. According to the report, modelling work had shown that a station at Newcourt would generate at least 500 individual daily journeys, which would mitigate the impacts of the Newcourt development at the already congested road junctions of Countess Wear and junction 30 of the M5. Provision of the station was costed at £4 million on the basis that construction would begin in 2015 for opening in 2016.

The fund will provide £1.5 million towards the station and the remainder will come from developers' contributions. Construction began in September 2014. The station opened on 4 June 2015.

The station could form part of the proposed "Devon Metro" rail network to increase connectivity to and from commuter towns such as Exmouth and Cullompton, with new stations at Marsh Barton, Monkerton and Cranbrook.

Description and facilities
Pedestrian access is provided from Liberty Way where there is a small drop-off area and disabled parking. Provision has been made for a future underpass crossing.

The station is situated partially within the former Royal Naval Stores Depot.

Services

References

External links

Railway stations in Exeter
Railway stations in Great Britain opened in 2015
2015 establishments in England
Railway stations opened by Network Rail
Railway stations served by Great Western Railway